Arnold Motorsports was a NASCAR Nextel Cup Series team operated by Don Arnold, owner of Arnold Development Companies and Arnold & Arnold Real Estate. 1983 Winston Cup champion Bobby Allison was the Vice President of operations and also served a consultant. From 2004 to 2005, the team formed a partnership with then-Craftsman Truck Series team Germain Racing as Germain-Arnold Racing, although Germain fielded Toyota Tundras in the Truck Series while the Cup Series team fielded Dodges.

History
Arnold Motorsports was formed in 2003 after the purchase of the race shop and equipment of Melling Racing. The team debuted as the No.79 Arnold Development Companies Dodge, with Pro Cup Series driver Billy Bigley Jr. driving., the team originally planned to run 34 races, but eventually scaled back its plans. After Bigley failed to qualify for the three events he attempted, he was released. Derrick Cope attempted the season finale at Homestead, but also failed to qualify.

The team returned full-time in 2004 with Derrike Cope at the wheel. Cope co-owned the team and merged his Quest Motor Racing team with Arnold's. The team briefly received sponsorship from Redneckjunk.com (unrelated to a RacingJunk.com that sponsored Carl Long during this same time frame), but was forced to remove its decals by NASCAR because the sanctioning body didn't believe it "projected the proper image of [the] sport." 
After twelve starts, Cope was replaced by Mike Wallace at Dover. Wallace, along with P. J. Jones, Jeff Fuller and Todd Bodine, finished out the year.

In 2005 Jimmy Spencer drove the car in what was a limited schedule due to lack of sponsorship. The team announced Allied Buildings as the sponsor for the rest of 2005 and all of 2006 at the Brickyard 400 at Indianapolis Motor Speedway. Arnold also owned a share of a Craftsman Truck Series team with Germain Motor Company as the No.30 Toyota. But Arnold sold the interest in that team to focus on Cup. The team's only attempt in 2006 came at the Daytona 500 with Larry Foyt as driver, but the team missed the race. In May 2006, the team announced it was shutting down. The shop later housed Spraker Racing in the ARCA Re/MAX Series Team founder Don Arnold died in December 2015.

In other media 
The team's 50 car is featured in the video game NASCAR 2005: Chase for the Cup driven by Cope, and in NASCAR 2006: Total Team Control driven by Jimmy Spencer. Germain Racing's truck series cars in the latter game were listed under Arnold Motorsports.

Motorsports career results

NASCAR
(key) (Bold – Pole position awarded by qualifying time. Italics – Pole position earned by points standings or practice time. * – Most laps led.)

Car No. 50 results

See also
 Germain Racing

References

External links
Jayski

Auto racing teams established in 2003
Auto racing teams disestablished in 2006
Defunct NASCAR teams
American auto racing teams
Defunct companies based in North Carolina
2003 establishments in North Carolina
2006 disestablishments in North Carolina